Ture Wilhelm "Thor" Axelsson (3 July 1921 – 2 August 2012) was a Finnish sprint canoer who competed in the late 1940s. He won two bronze medals at the 1948 Summer Olympics in London, earning them in the K-2 1000 m and K-2 10000 m events. He was born in Helsinki. Axelsson also won a gold medal in the K-2 500 m event at the 1948 ICF Canoe Sprint World Championships in London. Note that the K-2 500 m event did not become an official event at the Summer Olympics until the 1976 Games in Montreal. The event has been on the Olympic program since then.

References

Thor Axelsson's profile at Sports Reference.com

1921 births
2012 deaths
Sportspeople from Helsinki
Canoeists at the 1948 Summer Olympics
Finnish male canoeists
Olympic canoeists of Finland
Olympic bronze medalists for Finland
Olympic medalists in canoeing
ICF Canoe Sprint World Championships medalists in kayak

Medalists at the 1948 Summer Olympics